The 2013–14 Professional U21 Development League (League 1 referred to as the Barclays Under 21 Premier League for sponsorship reasons) was the second season of the Professional Development League system.

There were 42 participating teams in the 2013–14 Professional U21 Development Leagues; 22 in League 1, and 20 in League 2.

League 1 had a new format, with the three groups system being abandoned in favour of a single league system with the teams finishing in the top four positions qualifying for a playoff stage.

League 1

League stage 

Each team played twenty one fixtures during this stage. Having played each other once, either home or away, the top four teams in the table progressed to the knockout stage to determine the overall winner.

Starting with the 2014–15 season, the U21 Premier League was divided into two divisions. This means that the top 11 sides in the 2013–14 league stage qualify for the new Division 1, with the bottom 11 sides entering Division 2.

On 14 May, Chelsea defeated Manchester United in the final to claim the  Under-21 Premier League title. The top 8 teams in the final standings of the league stage qualified for the inaugural 2014–15 edition of the Premier League International Cup.

National Division

Table

Results

Knockout stage

Semifinals

Final

League 2

League stage 
Having played each other home and away, the top two teams from each division progressed to the knockout stage to determine the overall winner.

North Division

Table

Results

South Division

Table

Results

Knockout stage

Semifinals

Final

See also
 2013–14 Professional U18 Development League
 2013–14 FA Cup
 2013–14 FA Youth Cup
 2013–14 Under-21 Premier League Cup
 2013–14 in English football

References

2013–14 in English football leagues
2013-14